The Commonwealth Judo Association (CJA) is an international sporting body for judo across the Commonwealth of Nations.

The CJA was founded following a meeting held at the 1983 World Judo Championships in Seoul, South Korea. Mr. Owen Clarke (Scotland) was the first President, and Mr. Harry O’Rourke (New Zealand) the first Chairman. Mr. Owen was succeeded by Mr. O'Rourke, who combines the role of Chairman with that of Executive President. Mr. John Sullivan is current President. The CJA organises the biennial Commonwealth Judo Championships.

External links
Commonwealth Judo Association

Judo organizations
Judo